Jannetje (Nancy) Zeelenberg (Rotterdam, July 26, 1903 – Rotterdam, April 22, 1986) was a Dutch lawyer and politician. 

She was active in the field of women's emancipation and was chairman of the Onderlinge Vrouwenbescherming, Rotterdam Department, president of the Association for Women's Interest and Equal Citizenship (1946–1950), and member of the Committee of Inquiry into married civil servants working in the National Office.

References

1903 births
1986 deaths
Dutch political activists
Socialist feminists
20th-century women lawyers
20th-century Dutch lawyers